The nineteenth season of the American competitive reality television series Hell's Kitchen (subtitled as Hell's Kitchen: Las Vegas) premiered on Fox on January 7, 2021, and concluded on April 22, 2021. Gordon Ramsay returned as host and head chef, while season 10 winner Christina Wilson returned to serve as red team sous-chef, season seven runner-up Jason Santos joined to serve as blue team sous-chef, and Marino Monferrato returned to serve as maître d'hôtel. For the first time, the winner of this season received a position as a head chef at Gordon Ramsay Hell's Kitchen Restaurant in Lake Tahoe.

Prior to the United States premiere, the season began airing in the United Kingdom in October 2020 on ITV2.

The season was won by executive chef Kori Sutton, with chef de cuisine Mary Lou Davis finishing second, and executive chef Declan Horgan placing third.

Production
On February 26, 2019, it was announced that the series had been renewed for a nineteenth and twentieth season. Both seasons were filmed in 2019 (prior to the COVID-19 pandemic) on a set at Caesars Palace on Caesars Entertainment property in Las Vegas, Nevada, replicating the nearby Hell's Kitchen restaurant.

On November 10, 2020, it was announced that the nineteenth season would premiere on January 7, 2021.

Chefs
Eighteen chefs competed in season 19.

Notes

Contestant progress

Episodes

References 

Hell's Kitchen (American TV series)
2021 American television seasons